Fuck my life may refer to:

 FMyLife, an English-language blog
 Fuck My Life (film), a 2010 Chilean film
 FML, an initialism that can mean "Fuck my life"